Igor Zhornyak is a retired Ukrainian football player.

Career
Igor Zhornyak started his career in 1993 with Desna Chernihiv where he played 2 matches.In the season 1994–95 he played 3 matches and he got 11th place in Ukrainian Second League, getting 11 place in the league.In 1995 he moved to Voskhod Slavutich where he played 15 matches and 9 matches with the same club that changed its name to Nerafa Slavutych. In 1998 he played 2 matches with Fortuna-Cheksil Chernihiv. In 1998 he moved back to Desna Chernihiv where he played 8 matches in Ukrainian Second League in the season 1999–2000. He also played 6 matches with FC Nizhyn and 14 matches with Energiya Chernigov and then he moved to Mena, another club in the Chernihiv Oblast.

References

External links 
 Igor Zhornyak at footballfacts.ru

1976 births
Living people
Soviet footballers
Footballers from Chernihiv
FC Cheksyl Chernihiv players
FC Desna Chernihiv players
FC Slavutych players
Ukrainian footballers
Ukrainian Second League players
Association football defenders